Aphyllanthes is a genus of flowering plants  with only one species, Aphyllanthes  monspeliensis, endemic to the western Mediterranean region. It is the only genus in the Aphyllanthoideae, a subfamily of the family Asparagaceae. Aphyllanthoideae was formerly treated as a separate family, Aphyllanthaceae.

Aphyllanthes are popular rock garden plants due to their preferred habitat. Because they originate from the Mediterranean, they are adapted to hot and dry conditions. Additionally, their large and bright flowers are an attractive trait which has resulted in the increased cultivation of this species for market.

References

External links
 NCBI Taxonomy Browser
 links at CSDL, Texas

 
Monotypic Asparagaceae genera